Gjoricë is a former municipality in the Dibër County, eastern Albania. At the 2015 local government reform it became a subdivision of the municipality Bulqizë. The population at the 2011 census was 4,214.

Demographics
In 1900, Vasil Kanchov traveled throughout the region and reported on who lived there, finding that the towns of what is now the Gjoricë municipality included Gjoricë ( Gorica) with 900 Albanian Muslims, Viçisht with 130 Albanian Muslims and Lubalesh with 160 Albanian Muslims.

Lubalesh has some Macedonian Muslims living in the village.

During the 2000s linguists Klaus Steinke and Xhelal Ylli in search of Slavic speaking villages in Albania carried out fieldwork in settlements of the area. They visited villages such as Gjoricë and in that area found no Slavic speaking populations. Additionally detailed interviews with local inhabitants did not indicate that there where other places with Slavic speaking people inhabitants in this area.

Notable people
Vladan Gjurica, one of the principal advisors of Skanderbeg and chief army quartermaster

References

Former municipalities in Dibër County
Administrative units of Bulqizë